Paul Holdsworth (born 17 February 1970) is a former Australian rules footballer who played six games for the Sydney in the Victorian Football League (VFL) in 1989. He was recruited from the Clarence Football Club in the Tasmanian Football League  (TFL) with the 22nd selection in the 1988 VFL Draft.

References

External links

Living people
1970 births
Sydney Swans players
Clarence Football Club players
Australian rules footballers from Tasmania